The Neomedieval Forts are a complex of fortifications located in the mountainous area that closes the Ceuta peninsula on its border with Morocco.

History 
They were built in the mid-nineteenth century when, after the War of Wad-Ras with Morocco and sealed peace with the Treaty of Wad-Ras, it was considered appropriate to secure the border with a series of watchtowers to prevent possible aggression from the exterior. In this way, the towers of: Aranguren, Yebel Ányera, Renegado, very transformed, Isabel II, Francisco de Asís, Piniés and Mendizábal were raised, in addition to the Fort of Principe Alfonso.

References 

Buildings and structures in Ceuta